Limarí Province is one of three provinces of the Chilean region of Coquimbo Region (IV). Its capital is the city of Ovalle

Geography and demography
Between the 1992 and 2002 censuses, the population grew by 10.3% (14,607 persons).

Comunas
The province is composed by 5 comunas:

Ovalle
Río Hurtado
Monte Patria
Combarbalá
Punitaqui

Limarí Valley wine region
The Limarí Valley Denomination of Origin (DO) is defined by the Chilean Appellation system, the legally defined and protected geographical indication used to identify where the grapes for a wine were grown.
The valley is located 470 km (290 mi) north of Santiago, in the middle section of the Coquimbo region.
Best known for its Piscos, vines were first planted here in the mid-16th century and have seen a recent resurgence, due to new technologies and winemakers seeking new terroirs. The area is known for producing Sauvignon and Chardonnay, first planted during the 1990s, and also produces Syrah and Pinot, with a climate similar to Marlborough in New Zealand.
The Pacific Ocean has a strong influence on the region with the cooling Camanchaca, a fog that enters the valley from the west each morning and retreats as the sun rises over the Andes from the east. With less than 4 inches of rainfall per year, drip irrigation is used to water the vines that grow in the mineral-rich soil. The combination creates fresh wines with a distinct mineral edge.

Grape distribution by varietal

 Climate: Desert-like climate: 95 mm (4 in) of rainfall per year. Semi-arid region with cool coastal influences and good minerality in the soil.
 Soils: clay, silt and chalk.
 Primary grapes: cool-climate Syrah, Chardonnay, Sauvignon Blanc.

 Total hectares planted: 1,483 ha (3,665 acres).

See also
 Julio Alberto Mercado Illanes

References

Provinces of Coquimbo Region
Provinces of Chile